Elom Kodjo Nya-Vedji (born 24 November 1997) is a Togolese professional footballer who plays as a midfielder.

Career
He has played club football for Planète Foot Lomé. In February 2019, Nya-Vedji joined Montenegrin club FK Rudar Pljevlja.

He made his international debut on 4 June 2017 for Togo against Comoros.

References

External links

1997 births
Living people
Togolese footballers
Togolese expatriate footballers
Togo international footballers
21st-century Togolese people
Association football midfielders
FK Rudar Pljevlja players
FK Zeta players
KF Vllaznia Shkodër players
Montenegrin First League players
Kategoria Superiore players
Expatriate footballers in Montenegro
Expatriate footballers in Albania